Murala is a village of and union council of Mandi Bahauddin District in the Punjab province of Pakistan. Murala is 25 km from Mandi Bahauddin in an easterly direction, 12 km from Phalia in a northerly direction and 10 km from the town of Chailianwala in a southerly direction. where most of the families that casts are Warraich ,the village is also known as the murala warraicha  , they work agriculture very famous also for cane sugar and fish farm .

Education
The village has basic educational facilities, Government High School for Boys and Government High School for Girls are both present in village.

Agriculture
Dhok Kasib is a well-cultivated area; the main crops are wheat, rice potato, Lucerne, sorghum, maize, tobacco and sugar cane. Agriculture is the main economic pursuit; some also hold government jobs.

References

Union councils of Mandi Bahauddin District
Villages in Mandi Bahauddin District